Stepmonster is a 1993 American comedy horror film directed by Jeremy Stanford, executive produced by Roger Corman, and starring Alan Thicke, Robin Riker, George Gaynes, Ami Dolenz, Corey Feldman, Edie McClurg, John Astin,  and Billy Corben. It was a direct-to-video film. After its release, it was sometimes aired on The Disney Channel.

In the film, a boy's mother is kidnapped by a shapeshifting monster, called a tropopkin. The woman is declared missing, and her husband presumes that she has died. He is not particularly concerned, as he is engaged to marry another woman. The woman in question is the shapeshifting tropopkin, and plans to kill him during the next summer solstice. Her prospective stepson witnesses her killing various victims, and tries to expose her real identity.

Plot
The film starts off with art supplies and dramatic music. The art supplies draw an EC Comics knockoff that the camera zooms into, showing a family on vacation.

The family sees a "No Hunting" sign that seemingly says you can only hunt monsters called "tropopkins", and the kid of the family, Todd (Billy Corben), just happens to have a comic detailing what a tropopkin is. Todd's mom Abby (Molly Cheek) has a weird sense of humor and suggests that the sign could mean only tropopkins are allowed to hunt. Almost instantly the roar of a tropopkin is heard. Todd doesn't see the tropopkin, but he does find a giant chicken-like footprint, which matches the tropopkin footprint in his comic.

Just then a beautiful woman appears and seems to be flirting with Todd's dad George (Alan Thicke), who acts like a seemingly generic grumpy 1950s dad - humorless, irritating, and super-serious. Sometime later, a monster appears one night in the woods and chases Abby until catching her, and wrapping her in a cocoon.

6 months later, Todd is sadly living with his grandparents Shirley and Norman (Alice Hirson and George Gaynes) after the incident, with all, except Todd, believing the mother to be dead. George arrives and reveals that he will marry Denise Gore (Robin Riker), the suspicious beautiful woman from earlier, and has been dating her for the entire six months following Abby's disappearance and the time Todd got left with his grandparents. Todd has been unaware of this, and even the grandparents call out George for it.

There is a short little heartwarming scene between Todd and his grandpa Norman, filled with random sports metaphors, in the style of Benjamin Sisko from Star Trek: Deep Space Nine, on how everything is like baseball, or how everything ties into baseball.

Todd begins to get suspicious of Denise after her sees her gnawing on a bone, just like how he saw a tropopkin do the same thing in a comic book that details various things. Denise also has some tiny creature in a box that she talks to, and feeds it a live goldfish. George enters, notices a missing fish automatically, and blames Todd for it. The scene cuts to Todd being a peeping tom and watching his neighbor Wendy (Ami Dolenz) strip down. This ties into the plot, because Todd catches Denise eyeing a jogger at night.

She flirts with some fat, bald, middle-aged jogger (Mark Barbolak) who follows her, steps in a gooey dog mess leftover from a pet dog she seemingly ate, doesn't find this suspicious at all, and continues following her. The jogger seemingly finds a half eaten dog with her shoe, and he doesn't find this at all suspicious, and off-camera, Denise eats the jogger.

The next morning, the newspaper headline states "Jogger Found Dead", presumed to have been eaten by a dog. That night, George and Denise decide to go out and hire a babysitter for Todd, which happened to be Wendy, the neighbor that Todd was peeping on earlier. Wendy's boyfriend "Phlegm" (Corey Feldman) comes in, and he and Wendy have a date, much to Todd's dismay. Phlegm turns out to be smart, as he explains about how Denise is waiting on the summer solstice to eat George, and reveals that he knows this because he also reads comic books. It just happens that the summer solstice is on the same day as the wedding.

The next night, Denise is following a young paperboy (Eric Mettner) around, but this time Todd is there to watch her become her monstrous form. Todd watches her eat the little kid alive, tries to take photos for evidence that he wasn't just reading too many comic books about monsters, and runs off.

Todd gets the photos developed and shows them to his neighbor/babysitter without looking at them. However, they all seem to be photos from when he was peeping on her, as the ones of Denise in her real form instead came out in nothing but fuzz. Later that day, Todd found out the thing Denise keeps in her box is a giant bat-like monster. Todd goes after it with a baseball bat, breaks a bunch of things in the process, and ends up reprimanded by his dad.

Todd tries to tell George that the bat-like thing is called a harpy, and that harpies help tropopkins, but a disbelieving George grounds Todd and throws away his comics. George goes off to leave Todd alone with Denise. Due to this, Todd runs off to tell his grandfather all about tropopkins, but his grandfather doesn't believe him. With no one believing Todd, the evil monster forces Todd to do chores, during which Todd gets the idea to make a big trap to catch Denise in her monster form. Predictably, she turns back into a human the second George comes back.

Todd gets taken to see a psychiatrist, Dr. Emmerson (Edie McClurg). He tells Dr. Emmerson the whole truth and nothing but, and she predictably ignores it all and assumes that he's just exaggerating things and that the two would get along if Todd gave her a chance. Denise is then sent to go see Dr. Emmerson, and predictably, she turns into her tropopkin form and eats her, destroying evidence that Todd knew what he was talking about.

Todd's grandpa takes him out to a comic shop run by a flamboyant, cleanfreak Spock-like guy (Sean Whalen), and they look for a comic book on tropopkins so Todd can find out how to defeat them. Sadly, the comic book is $500, being a collector's copy.

Todd then seemingly goes to peep on Wendy again, but sees Denise going after her. He goes to warn her, and instead sees her in her underwear. As Wendy freaks out, the monster bursts through her door. The monster instead freaks out when it's covered by a blanket, and then flees. This convinces Wendy what Todd had been saying.

Todd then comes up with a plan: to get a loan on his violin to buy the $500 comic book—simply to gain the defeating information and then return the comic book and pay the pawnbroker right back, but Todd's dad George catches Todd in the act and threatens to throw the comic book away. Upon finding out that Todd got a loan on the violin, George angrily and rashly ripped up the $500 comic book into shreds. Todd and Wendy search through the garbage that night for the comic pieces and find all but the one piece of the comic book that reveals the monster's one weakness—just what Todd needed.

The wedding day arrives, and there is a shot of Denise, in monster form, in her wedding dress, using a deep voice—her real voice, which George doesn't find suspicious for more than a split second. Todd waxes the steps in the hopes Denise will fall and reveal her true form. Denise falls down the steps as expected but turns out completely fine. The minister (John Astin) then pronounces George and Denise man and wife.

By coincidence, Todd manages to find the last piece of the comic book hidden under the couch that reveals the weakness: Violin music, which explains Denise's hatred of the violin. Todd gets out his cassette recording of violin music, and Phlegm brings a bunch of Marshall amps to make the music loud to defeat the monster. Now believing Todd, Norman arrives to help blare the violin music to defeat the monster. They carry out their attack when George and Denise are alone in their bedroom that night, and George finally witnesses his wife transform. She doesn't kill him though, simply knocking him out with a wine bottle before running outside and being incapacitated by the violin music.

It turns out to be a trick, as the monster soon gets back up and goes after Todd, while her harpy arrives to destroy the cords that connect the amps, stopping the violin music and wrecking the cassette.  Just then George, having recovered, comes out with a violin (George had paid the loan back), and plays it at the monster—a Deus ex machina. The grandfather's non-sequitor baseball reference from earlier turns out to be useful, as the kid ends up killing the harpy with it.  The violin music kills Denise, and she disintegrates into nothingness. Todd and his dad reconcile.

The next day, as part of the reconciliation, Todd and George go hiking in the area from the beginning of the film. They find Denise's cave, complete with cocoons where Denise stored food for the winter. Todd and his dad free the victims from the cocoons, and the 3rd and final cocoon turns out to be Todd's mom Abby, who is alive! The film ends with the family happily walking away together while the camera pans down to reveal the comic book shown throughout the film, depicting the ending scene in panel-form.

Cast
Alan Thicke as George Dougherty
Molly Cheek as Abby Dougherty
Robin Riker as Denise Gore
George Gaynes  as Norman
Ami Dolenz as Wendy
Corey Feldman as Phlegm
Edie McClurg as Dr. Emmerson
John Astin as Minister
Billy Corben as Todd Dougherty

Reception
Rotten Tomatoes, a review aggregator, reports that 0% of five surveyed critics gave the film a positive review; the average review is 2.4/10.  TV Guide rated it 1/6 stars and wrote, "This blithely unambitious film succeeds on its own, limited terms." In a retrospective, John Campopiano of Dread Central described it as "full of ridiculous humor, a fun monster, and enjoyable cast performances".

References

External links
 
 

1993 films
1993 direct-to-video films
1990s comedy horror films
1990s monster movies
American comedy horror films
1993 comedy films
Films scored by Terry Plumeri
Films about missing people
Films about comics
Films about shapeshifting
1990s English-language films
1990s American films